The Christian Democratic Party of the Overthrow, previously named as Christian Democratic Party of Greece, is a conservative and Christian democratic political party of Greece. It was founded on May 23, 2013 by Nikos Nikolopoulos, a former MP of the New Democracy party from Achaea.

During the presentation of the party, Nikos Nikolopoulos stated that the Christian Democratic Party is located in the political spectrum in the place where New Democracy was before the elections of May 2012 and that it continues the political tradition of the founder of New Democracy, Konstantinos Karamanlis.

References

External links
 

Conservative parties in Greece
Christian democratic parties in Europe
Eastern Orthodox political parties
Political parties established in 2013
2013 establishments in Greece